Ann Marie Blyth (born August 16, 1928) is an American retired actress and singer. For her performance as Veda in the 1945 Michael Curtiz film Mildred Pierce, Blyth was nominated for an Academy Award for Best Supporting Actress. She is one of the last surviving stars from the Golden Age of Hollywood cinema, and became the earliest surviving Academy Award nominee upon the death of Angela Lansbury in October 2022 (Although Glynis Johns is the oldest living Oscar nominee).

Life and career

Early life
Anne Marie Blythe (she later dropped the "e" from her first name and surname) was born in Mount Kisco, New York, on August 16, 1928. After her father left the family, Anne, her elder sister (Dorothy) and their mother moved to a walk-up apartment on East 31st Street in New York City, where her mother took in ironing.

Watch on the Rhine
Blyth performed on children's radio shows in New York for six years, making her first appearance when she was five. When she was nine, she joined the New York Children's Opera Company.

Blyth's first acting role was on Broadway in Lillian Hellman's Watch on the Rhine (from 1941 until 1942). She played the part of Paul Lukas's daughter, Babette. The play ran for 378 performances, and won the New York Drama Critics' Circle Award. After the New York run, the play went on tour, and while performing at the Biltmore Theatre in Los Angeles, Blyth was offered a contract with Universal Studios.

Universal

Blyth began her acting career initially as "Anne Blyth", but changed the spelling of her first name to "Ann" at the beginning of her film career. She made her film debut in 1944, teamed with Donald O'Connor and Peggy Ryan in the teenager musical Chip Off the Old Block (1944). She followed it with two similar films: The Merry Monahans (1944), with O'Connor and Ryan again, and Babes on Swing Street (1944) with Ryan. She had a supporting role in the bigger-budgeted Bowery to Broadway (1944), a showcase of Universal musical talent.

On loan to Warner Brothers, Blyth was cast "against type" as Veda Pierce, the scheming, ungrateful daughter of Joan Crawford in Mildred Pierce (1945). Her dramatic portrayal won her outstanding reviews, and she received a nomination for an Academy Award for Best Supporting Actress. Blyth was only 16 when she made the Michael Curtiz film. (Crawford won the Best Actress award for that film).

After Mildred Pierce, Blyth sustained a broken back while tobogganing in Snow Valley and was not able to fully capitalize on the film's success.

She recovered and made two films for Mark Hellinger's unit at Universal: Swell Guy (1946), with Sonny Tufts, and Jules Dassin's Brute Force (1947) with Burt Lancaster. During this time, her father died. Universal lent her to MGM to play the female lead in Killer McCoy (1947), a boxing film with Mickey Rooney that was a box-office hit.

Back at Universal, Blyth did a film noir with Charles Boyer and Jessica Tandy, A Woman's Vengeance (1948), affecting a British accent. She was then cast in the part of Regina Hubbard in Lillian Hellman's Another Part of the Forest (1948), an adaptation of the 1946 play wherein Regina had been played by Patricia Neal. The play was a prequel to The Little Foxes. Blyth followed it with Mr. Peabody and the Mermaid (1948) with William Powell. She was top-billed in Red Canyon (1949), a Western with Howard Duff.

Universal lent Blyth to Paramount to play the female lead in Top o' the Morning (1949), as Barry Fitzgerald's daughter, who is romanced by Bing Crosby. Back at Universal, she was teamed with Robert Montgomery in Once More, My Darling (1949), meaning she had to drop out of Desert Legion. She did a comedy with Robert Cummings, Free for All (1949). In April 1949, Universal suspended her for refusing a lead role in Abandoned (1949). Gale Storm played it.

Universal lent her to Sam Goldwyn star opposite Farley Granger in Our Very Own (1950). Universal gave her top billing in a romantic comedy, Katie Did It (1951). Blyth was borrowed by MGM for The Great Caruso (1951) opposite Mario Lanza, which was a massive box-office hit. Back at Universal she made Thunder on the Hill (1951) with Claudette Colbert and had the female lead in The Golden Horde (1951) with David Farrar. 20th Century Fox borrowed her to star opposite Tyrone Power in I'll Never Forget You (1952), a last-minute replacement for Constance Smith. She appeared on TV in Family Theater in an episode called "The World's Greatest Mother" alongside Ethel Barrymore.

Universal teamed Blyth with Gregory Peck in The World in His Arms (1952). She was top-billed in the comedy Sally and Saint Anne (1952) and was borrowed by RKO for One Minute to Zero (1952), a Korean War drama with Robert Mitchum, wherein she replaced Claudette Colbert, who came down with pneumonia.

Metro-Goldwyn-Mayer

Metro-Goldwyn-Mayer had been interested in Blyth since she worked at the studio on The Great Caruso. In December 1952, she left Universal and signed a long-term contract with MGM. She was the leading lady in All the Brothers Were Valiant (1953) with Stewart Granger and Robert Taylor, stepping in for Elizabeth Taylor, who had to drop out due to pregnancy.

On television, Blyth appeared in The Lux Video Theatre version of A Place in the Sun with John Derek and Marilyn Erskine. Back at MGM, Blyth had the lead in the remake of Rose Marie (1954) with Howard Keel, which earned over $5 million, but lost money due to high costs. Plans to remake other MacDonald-Eddy films (such as The Girl of the Golden West) were discussed, but did not work out.

Blyth was meant to be reteamed with Lanza in The Student Prince (1954), but he was fired from the studio and replaced in the picture by Edmund Purdom; the film did well at the box office. Blyth and Purdom were reunited in a swashbuckler, The King's Thief (1955), with David Niven. She was teamed again with Keel on the musical Kismet (1955); despite strong reviews, the film was a financial flop. She was named as the female lead in The Adventures of Quentin Durward (1955), but Kay Kendall was cast in the film, instead. For her final picture at the studio, MGM put Blyth in Slander (1957) opposite Van Johnson.

Final features
Sidney Sheldon cast Blyth in The Buster Keaton Story (1957) with O'Connor at Paramount. Warner Bros. then cast her in the title role of The Helen Morgan Story (1957) directed by Michael Curtiz with Paul Newman. Blyth reportedly beat 40 other actors for the part. Though her voice was more like the original Helen Morgan, her vocals were dubbed by Gogi Grant. That soundtrack was much more successful than the film itself. Blyth made no further films.

In 1957, she sued Benedict Bogeaus for $75,000 for not making the film Conquest.

Theatre and television

From the late 1950s into the 1970s, Blyth worked in musical theater and summer stock, starring in the shows The King and I, The Sound of Music, and Show Boat. She also appeared sporadically on television, including co-starring opposite James Donald in the 1960 adaptation of A.J. Cronin's novel, The Citadel.

She guest-starred on episodes of The DuPont Show with June Allyson, The Dick Powell Theatre, Saints and Sinners, Wagon Train (several episodes), The Twilight Zone ("Queen of the Nile"), Burke's Law, Kraft Suspense Theatre, Insight, and The Name of the Game. Several of these appearances were for Four Star Television, with whom Blyth signed a multiple-appearance contract. Blyth became a spokesperson for Hostess Cupcakes.

Her last  television appearances were in episodes of Switch and Quincy, M.E. in 1983 and Murder, She Wrote in 1985. She then officially retired.

For her contributions to the film industry, Blyth has a motion picture star on the Hollywood Walk of Fame at 6733 Hollywood Boulevard.

Live performance
Blyth performed live in concert tours for many years with Harper MacKay serving as her accompanist and music director.

Personal life
In the December 1952 edition of Motion Picture and Television Magazine, Blyth stated in an interview that she was a Republican who had endorsed Dwight D. Eisenhower for president, the month before during the 1952 presidential election.

In 1953, Blyth married obstetrician James McNulty, brother of singer Dennis Day, who had introduced them. The bridesmaids were actresses Joan Leslie, Jane Withers, and Betty Lynn. The couple received a special commendation from the Pope. After her marriage, Blyth took a hiatus from her career to focus on raising their five children. In 1955, an armed man who had written her fan letters was arrested near her house.

Honors
In 1973, McNulty and she, both Catholics, were accorded the honorific rank of Lady and Knight of the Holy Sepulchre in a ceremony presided over by Cardinal Cooke.

In 2003, she was the recipient of the Living Legacy Award by the Women's International Center in 2003.

Later years
Blyth was widowed when Dr. McNulty died on May 13, 2007, in La Jolla, California, aged 89.

Filmography
Film

Television

Radio appearances

Award nominations

References

Further reading 
 Dye, David. Child and Youth Actors: Filmography of Their Entire Careers, 1914–1985. Jefferson, North Carolina: McFarland & Co., 1988, p. 22-23.

External links

 * Come Holy Ghost, Creator Blest, Ann Blyth

Ann Blyth "Women's International Centre" biography and more recent photograph
Photographs of Ann Blyth

Living people
Members of the Order of the Holy Sepulchre
Actresses from New York (state)
American child actresses
American film actresses
American radio actresses
American musical theatre actresses
American stage actresses
American television actresses
20th-century American actresses
People from Manhattan 
American Roman Catholics
American sopranos
Traditional pop music singers
Torch singers
Metro-Goldwyn-Mayer contract players
20th-century American singers
20th-century American women singers
California Republicans
Universal Pictures contract players
1928 births